This is a list of mayors of Memphis, Tennessee.

See also
 Timeline of Memphis, Tennessee

References

External links
Memphis Mayor's Office - MemphisTN.gov

Memphis, Tennessee